The 2012 Marburg Open was a professional tennis tournament played on hard courts. It was the third edition of the tournament which was part of the 2012 ATP Challenger Tour. It took place in Marburg, Germany between 25 June and 1 July 2012.

Björn Phau was the defending champion but chose to compete in Wimbledon instead.
Jan Hájek won the tournament by defeating Andreas Haider-Maurer 6–2, 6–2 in the final.

Seeds

Draw

Finals

Top half

Bottom half

References
 Main Draw
 Qualifying Draw

Marburg Open - Singles
2012 Singles